The Stockhorn is a mountain of the Bernese Alps, overlooking the region of Lake Thun in the Bernese Oberland. It is located north of the town of Erlenbach im Simmental.

It has a restaurant at the top and is a good starting point for many hikes. There is a subterranean water connection between the two lakes.

From the top the view includes many of the surrounding Alps; the Eiger, Mönch, Jungfrau, Schreckhorn, along with the valley of the Aare river, Thun and Lake Thun, Interlaken and the Jura Mountains.

See also
List of mountains of Switzerland accessible by public transport

References

External links

Stockhorn on Hikr

Bernese Alps
Mountains of the Alps
Mountains of Switzerland
Cable cars in Switzerland
Mountains of the canton of Bern
Two-thousanders of Switzerland